Mother Joan of the Angels (also known as The Devil and the Nun) is a 1961 Polish art film on demonic possession, directed by Jerzy Kawalerowicz, based on a novella of the same title by Jarosław Iwaszkiewicz, loosely based on the 17th century Loudun possessions. The film won the Special Jury Prize at the 1961 Cannes Film Festival.

Plot
The story takes place in and around a seventeenth century Polish convent. A priest, Father Józef Suryn (Mieczyslaw Voit), arrives at a small inn for a night's rest. He has been sent to investigate a case of demonic possession at the nearby convent after the local priest, Father Garniec, was burnt at the stake for sexually tempting the nuns. The next day, Father Suryn sets out for the convent, where he meets the abbess, Mother Joan (Lucyna Winnicka), said to be the most possessed of all the nuns. Already four priests before Father Suryn have tried to exorcise Mother Joan, but without success. The villagers at the inn are curious about the convent's troubled past and do everything to keep track of its developing story, with the stableman, Kaziuk (Jerzy Kaczmarek), leading Father Suryn around and asking the only non-possessed nun Sister Malgorzata (Anna Ciepielewska) for stories when she makes her nightly visits to the inn.

After Father Suryn learns that Mother Joan is possessed by eight demons, he and several other priests, during an exorcism, manage to exorcise the abbess. She and the other nuns appear cured. Soon after, however, the demonic possession increases. Mother Joan tries to seduce Father Suryn, begging him to make her a saint. In the meantime Sister Malgorzata leaves the convent and becomes Margareth after falling in love with Chrząszczewski (Stanisław Jasiukiewicz), a squire who visits the inn.

After a failed meeting takes place between Father Suryn and the local rabbi (also played by Voit), the priest re-enters the convent and receives Mother Joan's demons through his love for her. At night, reasoning that the only way to save the abbess is by doing Satan's bidding, Father Suryn grabs an axe and kills Kaziuk and Juraj, another stableman. The next morning, Margareth is abandoned by the squire, and finds Father Suryn holding the bloodied axe. The priest instructs her to go to Mother Joan and tell her of the sacrifice he made for her salvation in the name of love. Margareth runs back to the convent and cries with Mother Joan, neither saying a word.

Cast
 Lucyna Winnicka as Mother Joan of the Angels
 Mieczyslaw Voit as Father Jozef Suryn/Rabbi
 Anna Ciepielewska as Sister Malgorzata
 Maria Chwalibóg as Antosia
 Kazimierz Fabisiak as Father Brym
 Stanislaw Jasiukiewicz as Chrzaszczewski
 Zygmunt Zintel as Wincenty Wolodkowicz
 Jerzy Kaczmarek as Kaziuk
 Franciszek Pieczka as Odryn
 Jaroslaw Kuszewski as Juraj
 Lech Wojciechowski as Piatkowski
 Marian Nosek as Dominican Priest
 Jerzy Walden as Dominican Priest
 Marian Nowak
 Zygmunt Malawski as Exorcist

Background

This film is very loosely based on the real life outbreak of mass hysteria in the French town of Loudun in 1634 that occurred when a convent of Ursuline nuns, led by the hunchbacked Sister Jeanne of the Angels, became obsessed with a handsome, womanising priest, Urbain Grandier. When Grandier turned down the nun's invitation to become their spiritual director, Jeanne accused Grandier of using black magic to seduce her and her sisters and possess them with devils. Grandier's  enemies, including Cardinal Richelieu, used the accusation as an excuse to have him found guilty of witchcraft and executed.

Unlike Ken Russell's The Devils (1971), which depicts Grandier's trial and death, Mother Joan of the Angels instead depicts the events after his death. The nuns continued to be possessed for four years after his death, and further exorcisms were carried out by the sincere and deeply spiritual Father Joseph Suryn whose main concern was helping Sister Jeanne.

Critical reception

The film was recommended by Philip Jenkinson in the Radio Times. The film is among 21 digitally restored classic Polish films chosen for Martin Scorsese Presents: Masterpieces of Polish Cinema.

See also 
Cinema of Poland
List of Polish-language films

References

External links

U.K. DVD release of the film by Second Run

1961 films
1961 drama films
Polish drama films
1960s Polish-language films
Polish black-and-white films
Films based on short fiction
Films set in religious buildings and structures
Films set in Poland
Films set in the 17th century
Films directed by Jerzy Kawalerowicz
Films about Catholic nuns
Nunsploitation films
Films about spirit possession